The 8th Assembly District of Wisconsin is one of 99 districts in the Wisconsin State Assembly. Located in southeast Wisconsin, the district is entirely contained within Milwaukee County.  It comprises part of the city of Milwaukee's near-south side, including the Walker's Point Historic District, the Historic Mitchell Street neighborhood, and most of Lincoln Village.  The district is represented by Democrat Sylvia Ortiz-Velez, since January 2021.

The 8th Assembly district is located within Wisconsin's 3rd Senate district, along with the 7th and 9th Assembly districts.

List of past representatives

References 

Wisconsin State Assembly districts
Milwaukee County, Wisconsin